Mohammad Azizi (born January 13, 1988) is an Iranian footballer. He currently plays for Sanat Naft Abadan F.C. in the IPL.

Club career
In 2010, Azizi joined Sanat Naft Abadan F.C. after spending the previous season at Mes Rafsanjan in the Azadegan League.

Assist Goals

References

1988 births
Living people
Iranian footballers
Mes Rafsanjan players
Sanat Naft Abadan F.C. players
Azadegan League players
Association football midfielders